Shekhar Choudhary is an Indian politician and member of Indian National Congress party. He represented Gotegaon Vidhan Sabha. Previously he was the member of Bharatiya Janata Party and fought election from same constituency in 2008.

Early life 
He was born in Jabalpur, his father's name is late Shri Narayan Prasad Chaudhary was MLA from Patan (Madhya Pradesh Vidhan Sabha constituency) and has been Rajya Sabha member twice.

References 

Year of birth missing (living people)
Living people
Madhya Pradesh politicians
Indian National Congress politicians
Indian National Congress politicians from Madhya Pradesh